Meydan Tarreh Barahvaz (also Romanized as Meydān Tarreh Bārāhvāz) is a village in Elhayi Rural District, in the Central District of Ahvaz County, Khuzestan Province, Iran. At the 2006 census, its population was 129, in 26 families.

References 

Populated places in Ahvaz County